The following is a list of ecoregions in Botswana, according to the Worldwide Fund for Nature (WWF).

Terrestrial ecoregions

Tropical and subtropical grasslands, savannas, and shrublands

Kalahari Acacia-Baikiaea woodlands
Southern Africa bushveld
Zambezian Baikiaea woodlands
Zambezian and mopane woodlands

Flooded grasslands and savannas

Zambezian flooded grasslands
Zambezian halophytics

Deserts and xeric shrublands

Kalahari xeric savanna

Freshwater ecoregions

Zambezi

Kalahari
Okavango floodplains
Upper Zambezi floodplains

Southern Temperate

Western Orange

 
Botswana
Ecoregions